Richard Orjis (born 1979) is an artist based in Auckland, New Zealand.

Biography 

Orjis was born in Whanganui, New Zealand and studied at the Auckland University of Technology and Carnegie Mellon University, Pittsburgh earning a BVA  in 2001, and graduating with an MFA from The Elam School of Fine Art, University of Auckland in 2006. In 2021 Orjis obtained a PhD from Auckland University of Technology. The title of his doctoral thesis was Below, Behind, Across: Bttm Methodology and Queer Representation in Contemporary Art. While living in New York, Orjis worked for photographer and film maker David LaChapelle and collaborated on several projects with Cuban American artist Anthony Goicolea.

Work 

All his work is designed to illustrated non-existent, shadowy social groups, engaged in ambiguous activity. They appear to be a group of Europeans who have gone feral in a tropical jungle. Covered wholly or partially in mud, they stare dully out at the camera through elaborate necklaces and garlands of brightly coloured, sensuous flowers. Phallic and vulval forms dominate the arrangements (pitcher plants and orchids). The figures are passive and unthreatening, but also generate frissons of evil and madness and exert a horrid fascination. Mud was the medium of Orjis' graduation show in 2006, My Empire of Dirt. Using mud and water, he did a fey series of works on paper depicting semi-clad figures singly and in groups. Some scenes were set in woodland, and the heads of some figures seemed to have morphed into grotesque wood galls while others wore helmets.

Exhibitions 
2009

The Enchanted Garden, Art Gallery Toi o Tamaki, NZ

Richard Orjis, Starkwhite Gallery, Auckland, NZ*

Recent: Ten Contemporary NZ Photographers, Tauranga Art Gallery, NZ

Animal Farm: 4 Legs Good, Sargeant Gallery, Whanganui, NZ

Flora: Growth Between Neighbours, Victoria University, Melbourne, Australia

Seen this Century, Judith Anderson Gallery, Hastings, NZ

2008

little black flower grow, in the sky, Luis Adelantado, Valencia, Spain*

YES, Te Tuhi Centre for Arts, Auckland, NZ*

Richard Orjis, Starkwhite, Auckland, NZ*

Landslide, McNamara Gallery, Whanganui, NZ*

Welcome to the Jungle, The Physic Room, Christchurch, NZ*

The Maui Destiny, The Suter Te Aratoi o Whakatu, Nelson, NZ

2007

Vice, Luis Adelantado, Miami, USA

My Empire of Dirt: Selected works on paper, Roger Williams Contemporary, Auckland, NZ*

Picnics and Revolutions, Roger Williams Contemporary, Auckland, NZ

Richard Orjis / Todd Stratton, Roger Williams Contemporary, Auckland, NZ

Art is 4 Lovers, Butterfly Net, Auckland, NZ

Jewellery out of Context: an exhibition of New Zealand artists / curated by Dr Carole Sheperd and Peer Deckers, Object Space, Auckland, NZ

Fat of the Land, Creative New Zealand, Auckland, NZ

Asian at the Wheel, Gus Fisher Gallery, The University of Auckland, Auckland, NZ

2006

The New Situationists, City Gallery, Wellington, NZ

The New Situationists, Canary Gallery, Auckland, NZ

The Orchid Show, Mount Street, Auckland, NZ

Arquivar Tormentas, Centro Galego De Arte Contemporanea, Santiago, Spain

Dep_art_ment, Auckland, New Zealand*

Summer Exhibition, Roger Williams Contemporary, Auckland, NZ

2005

Me, Me, Me, Room 103, Auckland, New Zealand

Bring Your Caddy, Stanbeth House, Auckland, New Zealand

Dep_art_ment, Auckland, New Zealand*

2004

Richard Orjis, Galeria Luis Adelantado, Valencia, Spain*

Richard Orjis, Galeria Llucia Homs, Barcelona, Spain*

2003

In Faccia Al Mondo 'Contemporary Portraits in Photography', The Museum of Contemporary Art of Villa Croce, Genoa, Italy

Angst, RARE, New York City

Group Show, Galeria Luis Adelantado, Valencia, Spain

(*denotes solo shows)

Collections 

The Film Archive, Wellington, NZ

Jenny Gibbs Collection, Auckland, NZ

The Ministry of Education, Culture and Sport Collection, Madrid, Spain

The University of Auckland Art Collection, Auckland, NZ

Wallace Trust Collection, Auckland, NZ

Bibliography 

– Arevalo, Pilar, – 'Narcissist, artist or just taking the piss?', Oyster, Issue 43, December/January 2003, pp. 48–51

– Battersby, Shandelle, -'Richard Orjis, Artists and Mud Fan', Time Out, The New Zealand Herald, 17–23 May 2007, p. 5

– Brown, Warwick,-'Seen This Century:100 Contemporary New Zealand Artists’, Godwit, Random House, 2009, pp. 304–307

– Capdevilla, Marta, – ‘Up-State’, Suite, 29, October 2004, p. 64

– Chang, Lulu, – ‘ The Garden of Unearthly Delight’, Soma, Volume 21.4, May/June 2007,p. 30

– Coney, Hamish, -‘Future Schlock: An old fogey looks at the work of today’s yoof’, Ideolog, #7, January – February 2007, p. 95 or
http://idealog.co.nz/magazine/January-February-2007/workshop/future-schlock

– ‘Gallery’, Black, No 7, Summer 2007/08, p. 176 (Artists Page)

– Hall, Oliver, – ‘International Achiever’, Express, 25 April – 1 May 2007, pp. 10–11

– Hamilton, Summer, – ‘Auckland Art Fair 07’, KiaOra, May 2007, p72

– Laird, Tessa, -‘Secrets of the Soil: Richard Orjis and his Empire of Dirt’, White Fungus, Issue 8, 2007, pp. 34–41

– Lingard, Jason, – ‘Richard Orjis’, Nothing Magazine, Issue 11 2007 http://www.nothingmag.com/_issue11/index.html

– McNaughton, Harry, ‘ Richard Orjis’, No. Magazine, Issue 1, March 2008, pp. 18–19

– Mogutin, Slava, -‘Anthony et Richard’, TETU, No 88, April 2004, p. 34–35

– Mudie, Ella, -‘ The Dark side: Richard Orjis’, Dazed and Confused Aus/NZ, Volume 1 Issue 3 2007, p. 137

– Northcross, Wayne, – ‘ Razzle-Basel’, Instinct, Vol 6 Issue 2, February 2003, p. 16

– Olveira, Manuel, – ‘A Story with a viewpoint’, Arquivar Tormentas, Centro Galego De Arte Contemporanea, Santiago, Spain, pp. 27–31

– Orjis, Richard, – ‘Momento Mori’, New Zealand Home & Entertaining, April/May 2006, pp. 62–69

– Orjis, Richard – ‘Coal Choir’, No Magazine, Issue 2 2008, pp. 61–69

– Pickens, Robyn,- ‘Expressions of  Contradictions’, The Press, Christchurch, Wednesday, 16 April 2008, p.D5

– Real Art Trust Staff, – ‘Real Art Roadshow: The Book’, Real Art Charitable Trust, 2009, pp. 162–163

– Serrat, Carlos, ‘ Contemporary Paganism’, The Creator Studio’, # 11 Rituals, April 2008, pp. 4–13

– Suau, Christina, – ‘Richard Orjis’, ELLE, Spain, No. 197, February 2003, p. 72

– Tabron, Delaney, – ‘Richard Orjis’, Pavement, Summer 2004/2005, Issue 66, p. 43

– Ventur, Conrad, -‘NYC Photographers’, Useless Magazine, Vol 1 No 1, Fall/Winter 2004, p. 46

– Williams, Melinda, – ‘Hip to be square’, Sunday Life and View, Herald on Sunday, 3–9 April 2005, pp. 6–8

References

1. Warwick Brown, ‘Seen This Century:100 Contemporary New Zealand Artists’, Godwit, Random House, 2009, pp. 304–307

External links 
 luisade lantadovalencia
 Gallery of McNamara

New Zealand artists
Living people
1979 births
Elam Art School alumni